Eduardo Filippini (born June 5, 1983, in Formosa, Argentina) is an Argentine footballer who plays for Guaraní of the Primera Division in Paraguay.

Career
Although he was born in Formosa, Argentina (located near the border with Paraguay), Filippini's ancestors were Paraguayan. After a spell with Club 2 de Mayo, Filippini returned to Guaraní in 2008.

In 2010, after five years playing football for clubs in Paraguay, Filippini became a naturalized Paraguayan citizen in hopes of representing the Paraguay national football team.

Personal
His older brother, Valentín Filippini, is also a professional footballer.

Teams
  Guaraní 2004-2006
  Martín Ledesma 2007
  2 de Mayo 2008
  Guaraní 2008–present

References

External links
 

1983 births
Living people
People from Formosa, Argentina
Argentine footballers
Argentine expatriate footballers
Club Guaraní players
Expatriate footballers in Paraguay
Association footballers not categorized by position